USS Madison (DD-425) was a Benson-class destroyer in the United States Navy during World War II. She is the third Navy ship of that name, and the first named for Commander James J. Madison (1888–1922), who was awarded the Medal of Honor during World War I.

Madison was laid down on 19 September 1938 by the Boston Navy Yard; launched on 20 October 1939; sponsored by Mrs. Ethel Madison Meyn, widow of Commander Madison; and commissioned on 6 August 1940.

Pre World War II service
Prior to the entry of the United States into World War II, the destroyer saw over a year's service opposing the spread of Axis power. In addition to Neutrality Patrol in the Caribbean and North Atlantic convoy duty, she was escort on two diplomatic voyages in January 1941. She escorted  as the cruiser carried Admiral William D. Leahy to Portugal en route to France to become Ambassador to the Vichy France Government.

Mediterranean and Arctic convoys
Following the formulation of the Atlantic Charter, Madison returned to convoy and patrol duty. She operated in the North Atlantic and along the east coast until the spring of 1942. On 4 April Madison put into Scapa Flow and became a unit of the British Home Fleet. Steaming at first between Greenock, Scotland and the Mediterranean, Madison was with  when that aircraft carrier delivered Supermarine Spitfires to the besieged island of Malta. These planes enabled the residents to hold on to their position, preventing Axis air supremacy in the western Mediterranean, and providing a future logistics base for the Allies. Returning from this mission, Madison patrolled the North Sea and the convoy routes to Murmansk.

Operation Torch
Resuming operations as part of the Atlantic Fleet, Madison took up her convoy duty anew. She made quick trips to Panama, the gulf ports and various ports in the United Kingdom. On 2 November, she departed New York City for Casablanca with convoy UGF 2 of troops and supplies to support the initial invasion of north Africa. Arriving in mid-November, she remained on local patrol and escort duty off Casablanca until the end of the year.

Convoy duty, Operation Shingle and Anvil-Dragoon
Standing out of New York 30 January 1943, the destroyer made one convoy run to Derry, Northern Ireland, before commencing, in February, "oil runs" from Curaçao to the United Kingdom. For the remainder of the year, she continued to escort convoys of tankers and other types of merchant ships between the Netherlands West Indies, New York, north Africa, and various United Kingdom and Mediterranean ports.

Madisons next assignment was to the Mediterranean. Arriving at Oran, Algeria, 30 January 1944, she practiced shore bombardment before departing for Italy on 11 February. Operating off Anzio, she continued antisubmarine patrols and provided antiaircraft protection and support gunfire until mid-April, when she commenced convoy and patrol duty throughout the Mediterranean. In August, Madison once again joined the support force for a landing, this time in the south of France. During Operation Dragoon, Madison, on antisubmarine patrol and fire support duty on 10 September, made four certain kills of human torpedoes and one probable.

Convoys escorted

Pacific service
Returning home in January 1945, Madison escorted one more convoy to Mediterranean ports and returned before departing the east coast 21 April for the Pacific Ocean, arriving Guam on 1 July. Following a convoy run to Okinawa and back, Madison was assigned to a picket station off Ulithi. Later, she steamed to Tokyo Bay to witness the formal surrender of the Japanese forces.

End of World War II and fate
Following the war's end, Madison remained with the occupation forces until 5 November when she sailed for Charleston, South Carolina. Having steamed more than 300,000 miles (550,000 km) during the course of the war, Madison arrived at Charleston 7 December 1945. She was placed out of commission in reserve 13 March 1946 at Charleston and later moved to Orange, Texas. She was struck from the Navy List 1 June 1968. She was sunk as target off southeastern Florida on 14 October 1969.

Awards
Madison received five battle stars for World War II service.

References

External links

 

Benson-class destroyers
Ships built in Boston
1939 ships
World War II destroyers of the United States
Shipwrecks of the Florida coast
Maritime incidents in 1969
Ships sunk as targets